Richard Cant is a British actor.

He is the son of actor and children's television presenter Brian Cant.

Cant made two appearances on the long-running murder mystery series Midsomer Murders, appearing in the 1997 pilot episode The Killings at Badger's Drift as undertaker Dennis Rainbird, alongside Elizabeth Spriggs who played his mother, and then again as Dennis Rainbird's cousin, Alistair Gooding, in the 2006 story Dead Letters. In the second story, he appeared alongside Jason Hughes, who played Detective Sergeant Ben Jones; Richard had previously appeared with Jason Hughes in an episode of the cult BBC 2 TV series This Life, where he played Phil, a friend of Hughes's character Warren.

Other television and film appearances include " Stan and Ollie", "Mary, Queen of Scots", 'The Crown", "It's a Sin",The Way We Live Now, Bleak House, Gimme Gimme Gimme, and Gunpowder Treason and Plot. In 2007 he appeared in an episode of Doctor Who, "Blink".

He has worked on stage for The National Theatre, RSC, Royal Court, Cheek by Jowl, and Sheffield Crucible.

He appeared as Friedrich in War Horse at the New London Theatre.

Selected television work

This Life (1996)
Midsomer Murders (1997) & (2006)
Gimme Gimme Gimme (1999)
Lawless Heart (2001)
The Way We Live Now (2001)
Shackleton (2002)
Ian Fleming: Bondmaker (2005)
Bleak House (2005)
Sparkle (2007)
Doctor Who (2007)
The Bill (2008)
Vexed (2010)
Mapp and Lucia (2014)
The Crown (2020)
It's A Sin (2021)

Selected stage work
 As You Like It (Cheek by Jowl)
War Horse (2012/13, NT at New London Theatre)
Salome (Headlong)
Troilus and Cressida (Cheek by Jowl)
Cymbeline (Cheek by Jowl)
The Country Wife (Sheffield Crucible)

References

External links

English male television actors
Living people
Year of birth missing (living people)